Lishimen Reservoir is a reservoir in the town of , in Tiantai County, Zhejiang, China. It also known as "Hanshan Lake" due to the Tang dynasty poet-monk Hanshan lived here in seclusion for a long time.

History
Construction of Lishimen Reservoir, designed by Zhejiang Hydropower Design Institute, commenced in May 1973 and was completed in November 1979. The total investment of the project was 27.54 million yuan.

Dam

Culture
The reservoir served as a shooting location for the 2021 war film The Battle at Lake Changjin.

References 

Tiantai County
Reservoirs in Zhejiang